This list of museums in Texas encompasses museums defined for this context as institutions (including nonprofit organizations, government entities, and private businesses) that collect and care for objects of cultural, artistic, scientific, or historical interest and make their collections or related exhibits available for public viewing.  Museums that exist only in cyberspace (i.e., virtual museums) are not included.  Also included are non-profit art galleries and exhibit spaces.

Lists of Texas institutions which are not museums are noted in the "See also" section, below.

Central Texas

Includes the cities of Austin, Bryan, Burnet, Fredericksburg, Gonzales, Kerrville, La Grange, New Braunfels, San Antonio, San Marcos, Seguin, Waco, West.

Counties included are Bandera, Bastrop, Bell, Bexar, Blanco, Bosque, Brazos, Burleson, Burnet, Caldwell, Comal, Comanche, Coryell, Falls, Fayette, Freestone, Gillespie, Grimes, Hamilton, Hays, Hill, Kendall, Kerr, Kimble, Lampasas, Lee, Leon, Limestone, Llano, Madison, Mason, McLennan, Milam, Mills, Robertson, San Saba, Travis, Washington, Williamson County, and Wilson.

East Texas

Includes the cities of Beaumont, Columbus, Corsicana, Gilmer, Huntsville, Marshall, Mount Vernon, Nacogdoches, Nederland, Orange, Port Arthur, Port Neches, Texarkana, Tyler and Washington-on-the-Brazos.

Counties included are Anderson, Angelina, Bowie, Camp, Cass, Cherokee, Delta, Franklin, Gregg, Hardin, Harrison, Henderson, Hopkins, Houston, Jasper, Jefferson, Lamar, Marion, Morris, Nacogdoches, Newton, Orange, Panola, Polk, Rains, Red River, Rusk, Sabine, San Augustine, San Jacinto, Shelby, Smith, Titus, Trinity, Tyler, Upshur, Van Zandt and Wood.

North Texas

Includes the cities of Addison, Arlington, Cisco, Dallas, Denison, Denton, Eastland, Fort Worth, Glen Rose, Hillsboro, Irving, McKinney, Paris, Plano, Waxahachie and Wichita Falls.

Counties included are Archer, Baylor, Clay, Collin, Cooke, Cottle, Dallas, Denton, Ellis, Erath, Fannin, Foard, Grayson, Hardeman, Hood, Hunt, Jack, Johnson, Kaufman, Montague, Navarro, Palo Pinto, Parker, Rockwall, Somervell, Tarrant, Wichita, Wilbarger, Wise, and Young.

South Texas and Texas Gulf Coast

Includes the cities of Alvin, Brownsville, Corpus Christi, Galveston, Goliad, Harlingen, Houston, La Porte, and Victoria.

Counties included are Austin, Brazoria, Chambers, Colorado, Fort Bend, Galveston, Harris, Liberty, Matagorda, Montgomery, Walker, Waller, and Wharton.

Includes the cities of Alice, Beeville, Brackettville, Cuero, Laredo, Uvalde.

Counties included are Aransas, Atascosa, Bee, Brooks, Calhoun, Cameron, DeWitt, Dimmit, Duval, Edwards, Frio, Goliad, Gonzales, Guadalupe, Hidalgo, Jackson, Jim Hogg, Jim Wells, Karnes, Kenedy, Kinney, Kleberg, La Salle, Lavaca, Live Oak, McMullen, Maverick, Medina, Nueces, Real, Refugio, San Patricio, Starr, Uvalde, Val Verde, Victoria, Webb, Willacy, Zapata and Zavala.

West Texas and Texas Panhandle

Counties included are Armstrong, Briscoe, Carson, Castro, Childress, Collingsworth, Dallam, Deaf Smith, Donley, Gray, Hall, Hansford, Hartley, Hemphill, Hutchinson, Lipscomb, Moore, Ochiltree, Oldham, Parmer, Potter, Randall, Roberts, Sherman, Swisher and Wheeler.

Counties included are Andrews, Bailey, Borden, Brewster, Brown, Callahan, Cochran, Coke, Coleman, Comanche, Concho, Crane, Crockett, Crosby, Culberson, Dawson, Dickens, Eastland, Ector, El Paso, Fisher, Floyd, Gaines, Garza, Glasscock, Hale, Haskell, Hockley, Howard, Hudspeth, Irion, Jeff Davis, Jones, Kent, Kimble, King, Knox, Lamb, Loving, Lubbock, Lynn, Martin, Mason, McCulloch, Menard, Midland, Mitchell, Motley, Nolan, Pecos, Presidio, Reagan, Reeves, Runnels, Schleicher, Scurry, Shackelford, Stephens, Sterling, Stonewall, Sutton, Taylor, Terrell, Terry, Throckmorton, Tom Green, Upton, Ward, Winkler and Yoakum.

See also
Historic landmarks in Texas
Museums list
List of nature centers in Texas
Registered Historic Places in Texas

References

External links
Texas Association of Museums
Historic House Museums in Texas
Historical Museum Guide for Texas

Texas